Lysandre is a French spelling of the Greek name Lysander, and may refer to:

Lysandre, a character in les Amours de Lysandre et Caliste, by Vital d'Audiguier Paris, 1615
Lysandre, a character in Corneille's comedy La Galerie du Palais, 1632
Lysandre, a fictional character and the main antagonist in Pokémon X and Y
Lysandre (Christopher Owens album), the debut solo album of Christopher Owens

See also
 Lysander (disambiguation)